Jennifer D. Parker is an American statistician who works as the Director of the Division of Research and Methodology at the National Center for Health Statistics. Her publications include  highly-cited works relating socioeconomic status, air pollution, and birth weight of infants.

Education and career
Parker completed her Ph.D. in biostatistics at the University of California, Berkeley, and did postdoctoral research at the University of California, San Francisco.

As well as her position at the National Center for Health Statistics, Parker holds a position as adjunct research professor in the Department of Applied Environmental Health of the University of Maryland School of Public Health.

Recognition
Parker served as the president of the Caucus for Women in Statistics in 2010. In 2017, she was elected as a Fellow of the American Statistical Association.

Selected publications

References

Year of birth missing (living people)
Living people
American statisticians
Women statisticians
University of California, Berkeley alumni
University of Maryland, College Park faculty
Fellows of the American Statistical Association